Dungeness on Cumberland Island, Georgia, is a ruined mansion that is part of a historic district that was the home of several families significant in American history. James Oglethorpe first built on Cumberland Island in 1736, building a hunting lodge that he named Dungeness. Oglethorpe named the place after the Dungeness headland, on the south coast of England. Dungeness was next the legacy of Revolutionary War hero Nathanael Greene, who had acquired  of island land in exchange for a bad debt. In 1803, his widow Catharine Littlefield Greene built a four-story tabby mansion over a Timucuan shell mound. During the War of 1812 the island was occupied by the British, who used the house as a headquarters.

In 1818 Henry “Light-Horse Harry” Lee, a cavalry commander during the Revolutionary War and father of Robert E. Lee, stayed at the house until his death on March 25, 1818, cared for by Greene's daughter Louisa, and was laid to rest in nearby cemetery with full military honors provided by an American fleet stationed at St. Marys, Georgia. The house was abandoned during the U.S. Civil War and burned in 1866.

In the 1880s the property was purchased by Thomas M. Carnegie, brother of Andrew Carnegie, who began to build a new mansion on the site.  The 59-room Queen Anne style mansion and grounds were completed after Carnegie's death in 1886. His wife Lucy continued to live at Dungeness and built other estates for her children, including Greyfield for Margaret Carnegie Ricketson, Plum Orchard for George Lauder Carnegie, and Stafford Plantation. By this time, the Carnegies owned 90% of the island.

The Carnegies moved out of Dungeness in 1925. In 1959 the Dungeness mansion was destroyed by fire, alleged to be arson. The ruins are today preserved by the National Park Service as part of Cumberland Island National Seashore. They were acquired by the Park Service in 1972.

The main house comprises a portion of the larger historic district, which includes servant's quarters, utility buildings, laundries, cisterns, and a variety of other structures. The district forms a planned, landscaped ensemble. The most significant supporting structure is the Tabby House or Nathanael Greene Cottage, which dates to the Greene family's tenure.

References

External links

Houses in Camden County, Georgia
Lee family residences
Historic districts on the National Register of Historic Places in Georgia (U.S. state)
Queen Anne architecture in Georgia (U.S. state)
Ruins in the United States
Shingle Style houses
National Register of Historic Places in Cumberland Island National Seashore
Historic American Buildings Survey in Georgia (U.S. state)
Tabby buildings
Shingle Style architecture in Georgia (U.S. state)
Carnegie family residences